Lee Peter Unsworth (born 25 February 1973) in Eccles, Lancashire is a former footballer who played as a defender in the Football League in the 1990s and 2000s.

Playing career
He began his career with Ashton United, before signing for Crewe Alexandra of the Football League. He made his Crewe debut against Wycombe Wanderers on the opening day of the 1995–96 season, with his debut goal following 11 days later in a League Cup match against Darlington.

He played over 150 senior games for them before moving to Bury on a free transfer in July 2000. He played 175 senior games for Bury before leaving the club in March 2006. He moved to Hyde United for the latter part of the 2005−06 season.

Unsworth joined Leigh RMI in October 2006. In January 2008, he signed for Northern Premier League Division One North club Chorley. He was signed by Radcliffe Borough in August 2008. He made 11 appearances for Radcliffe in the 2009–10 season before leaving the club.

Coaching career
Unsworth joined Manchester United as an academy coach in August 2009. He is the current coach of the under-12s.

Honours
with Crewe Alexandra
Football League Second Division play-offs: 1997

References

External links

1973 births
Living people
People from Eccles, Greater Manchester
Association football defenders
English Football League players
Ashton United F.C. players
Crewe Alexandra F.C. players
Bury F.C. players
Hyde United F.C. players
Leigh Genesis F.C. players
Chorley F.C. players
Radcliffe F.C. players
English footballers
Manchester United F.C. non-playing staff